The 2018 GT4 International Cup was the first edition of the GT4 International Cup held at Bahrain International Circuit on 1 December 2018. The race was contested with GT4-spec cars. The event promoters were the Bahrain Motorsport Federation (BMF) and the Stéphane Ratel Organisation (SRO).

Entry list

Results

Main race

See also
2018 FIA GT Nations Cup

References

External links

GT4 International Cup
GT4 International Cup
GT4 International Cup